Musik, dans & party 4 is a 1988 studio album by Sten & Stanley.

Track listing
Kärleken
Tack för alla åren
Stormande hav
Högt uppe på berget (On Top of the Old Smokey)
Milda makter
Låt tiden stå still (One Moment in Time)
Var det igår (What Do You Want to Make those Eyes at Me for)
I ett litet hus
Hand i hand (Hand in Hand)
Rita
Leende guldbruna ögon (Beautiful Brown Eyes)
Tid (A Bunch of Thyme)
Klättra upp för stegen (Tie a Yellow Ribbon)
Försent skall syndar'n vakna (Today's Teardrops)

Charts

References 

1988 albums
Sten & Stanley albums